Turanana is a genus of butterflies in the family Lycaenidae. It is found in the east Palearctic from Greece to Central Asia.

Species
Turanana anisophthalma (Kollar, [1849]) Kopet-Dagh Mountains, West Pamirs, Iran (Elburs Mountains, Zagros Mountains), Afghanistan (Hindu Kush)
Turanana chitrali Charmeux & Pagès, 2004 Pakistan (Zani Pass)
Turanana cytis (Christoph, 1877)
Turanana dushak Dubatolov, 1989 Kopet-Dagh Mountains
Turanana endymion (Freyer, 1850)
Turanana grumi Forster, 1937 Pamirs, Northeast Hindu Kush
Turanana jurileontyi Shchetkin, 1986 Turkenstansky Mountains
Turanana kugitangi Zhdanko, 1984 Armenia (mountains), Kopet-Dagh Mountains, South Ghissar
Turanana laspura (Evans, 1932) Turkestansky Mountains, Ghissar, Darvaz, Pamirs, Alai, NorthWest Himalaya
Turanana mystica Morgun & Tikhonov, 2010 Daghestan
Turanana panaegides (Staudinger, 1886) Ghissar, West Tian-Shan, Inner Tian-Shan, Alai, Pamirs, Hindu Kush
Turanana taygetica (Rebel, 1902)

References

 , 2011: Deux nouveaux Polyommatini du Tadjikistan : Turanana laspura panjensis ssp. nova et Agriades pheretiades ishkashimensis ssp. nova (Lepidoptera : Lycaenidae). Les Lépidoptéristes de France 20 (48): 7-13.
 , 2004: A new species of the genus Turanana from Pakistan (Lepidoptera: Lycaenidae). Phegea 32 (2): 63-69. PDF.
 , 2005: Revision of the Turanana endymion species-group (Lycaenidae). Nota Lepidopterologica 27 (4): 251—272. Full Article: .
 , 2006: Additional revisionary actions and corrections in the Turanana endymion species-group (Lycaenidae). Nota Lepidopterologica 29 (1/2): 17—25. Full Article: .
 , 2010: Turanana mystica spec. nov., a new lycaenid from the Great Caucasus. (Lepidoptera: Lycaenidae). Atalanta 41 (3/4): 331-334.

External links
images  representing  Turanana  at  Consortium for the Barcode of Life

Polyommatini
Lycaenidae genera
Taxa named by George Thomas Bethune-Baker